Lecoq is a surname. Notable people with the surname include:

Karl Ludwig von Lecoq (1754–1829) of French Huguenot ancestry, first joined the army of the Electorate of Saxony, later transferred his loyalty to the Kingdom of Prussia and fought Napoleonic Wars
Karl Christian Erdmann von Lecoq (1767–1830), a Saxon officer who rose to rank lieutenant-general during the Napoleonic Wars and was the commanding officer of the Royal Saxon army
 Henri Lecoq (1802–1871), a French botanist
 Paul Emile Lecoq de Boisbaudran (1838–1912), a French chemist, discoverer of the chemical elements gallium, samarium and dysprosium
 Maurice Lecoq (1854–1925), a French sport shooter who competed in the late 19th and early 20th centuries
 Jacques Lecoq (1921–1999), a French actor, mime and acting instruction
Jacqueline Lecoq (born 1932), French designer who collaborated for many years with Antoine Philippon
 Paul Lecoq, Swiss senior physicist at CERN

See also 
 Monsieur Lecoq, a fictional character, the creation of Émile Gaboriau, a 19th-century French writer and journalist
 Le Coq (disambiguation)
 Lecocq